Shane Burgmann (born 7 January 1974) is a former Australian rules footballer who played for Melbourne in the Australian Football League (AFL) in 1992. He was recruited from the Berwick Football Club  in the Mornington Peninsula Nepean Football League (MPNFL).  He is the son of Lloyd Burgmann, who played for Melbourne in the 1970s.

After being delisted by Melbourne he played reserves for Hawthorn in 1994.

References

External links

Living people
1974 births
Melbourne Football Club players
Australian rules footballers from Victoria (Australia)